Pentacosylic acid, or pentacosanoic acid, or hyenic acid, is a 25-carbon long-chain saturated fatty acid with the chemical formula .

See also
List of saturated fatty acids
Very long chain fatty acids
List of carboxylic acids

References 

Fatty acids
Alkanoic acids